Chamaemyia flavipalpis  is a species of fly in the family Chamaemyiidae. It is found in the Palearctic. and North Africa.

References

External links
 Images representing Chamaemyia flavipalpis  at BOLD

Chamaemyiidae
Diptera of Africa
Muscomorph flies of Europe
Insects described in 1838
Taxa named by Alexander Henry Haliday